Vikas Shrivastav is an Indian actor who has appeared primarily in Hindi films.

Career
Vikas Shrivasatav was born in Bihar and grew up in Uttar Pradesh. He worked in theatre since he was young. He started his career as an actor with Gangaajal. Vikas got his breakthrough as an actor in several successful films including The Dirty Picture (2011), Talaash: The Answer Lies Within (2012), Dhoom 3 (2013), Special 26 (2013), and Gabbar Is Back (2015). He has worked on the short films Hanki Panki (2013) and Meena (2014). He played the lead role as Nirbhay Gujjar in Beehad - The Ravine (2013). In 2019, he turned lyricist for the film, The Gandhi Murder and debuted in Tamil cinema with Kadaram Kondan. In 2020, he was cast in the  Savdhan India FIR Series as an honest police officer.

Incident
In 2016, an incident occurred after Shrivastav returned from Dehradun to Versova in which several lakhs worth of  valuables were stolen. The suspect was later revealed to be  Narendra Tak, an actor, who stayed with Shrivastav.

Selected filmography
All works are in Hindi, unless otherwise noted.

Films

Short films

Television

References

External links
 

Living people
Male actors in Hindi cinema
Indian male film actors
Indian male stage actors
21st-century Indian male actors
Male actors in Hindi television
Year of birth missing (living people)